Cycas megacarpa is a species of cycad, native to Queensland.

References

megacarpa
Flora of Queensland